Wicklow railway station is a railway station in Wicklow, County Wicklow, Ireland.

Facilities
The main station building is on platform 1.  There are a waiting room and toilets next to the ticket office. An automatic ticket machine is near the ticket office. The waiting room on platform 2 is no longer in use and a covered shelter is provided. The station has a pay and display car park with capacity for 80 vehicles and a bicycle parking area.  The station is staffed full-time.

Description
It is a two-platform station with a passing loop. A typical DSER signal cabin is on the footbridge. At the Dublin end, there is a bridge on a curve.

As with other stations on the route between Wicklow and Rosslare Europort, semaphore signalling and ETS operation ceased here in April 2008, with the line now under the control of the mini-CTC system.

Services/Routes

The service from the station is:

Monday to Friday
5 trains per day to Dublin Connolly via Bray Daly (one continuing to Dundalk Clarke)
4 trains per day to Rosslare Europort via Arklow
1 train per day to Wexford O'Hanrahan via Arklow

Saturdays
4 trains per day to Dublin Connolly via Bray Daly (one continuing to Dundalk Clarke)
3 trains per day to Rosslare Europort via Arklow

Sundays
3 trains per day to Dublin Connolly via Bray Daly
3 trains per day to Rosslare Europort via Arklow

Transport
Local Link route 183 commenced in April 2019 and provides a link from the station to Glendalough several times a day.

Bus Eireann route 133, from Wicklow to Dublin Airport, stops at Tesco, which is located 550 m from the station.

See also
 List of railway stations in Ireland

References

External links

Irish Rail Wicklow station Website
Wicklow station Facebook page

Iarnród Éireann stations in County Wicklow
Railway stations in County Wicklow
Wicklow (town)
Railway stations opened in 1855
1855 establishments in Ireland
Railway stations in the Republic of Ireland opened in the 19th century